The western basilisk, or red-headed basilisk (Basiliscus galeritus), is a large species of lizard in the family Corytophanidae. The species is endemic to northwestern South America.

Etymology
The specific name, galeritus, which is Latin, means "wearing a hood", referring to the head crest.

Habitat and geographic range
Earlier reports of its occurrence in Central America are mistaken and actually refer to young of the closely related common basilisk.

Conservation status
The western basilisk is common and not threatened.

Description
Its body color is olive-green with a reddish-brown underbelly. The throat is white to yellow. On the back it has a small crest similar to that of young individuals of the common basilisk. It may have a narrow white stripe or a row of white dots on each side. It has no back flap. The adult males bear a round head flap/crest.

Invasive species
The western basilisk has been introduced to Gorgona Island, Colombia. This species is not native to the island, and thus, is endangering native species that reside on the island, such as the endemic blue anole (Anolis gorgonae).

References

External links

Basiliscus galeritus photograph

Further reading
Boulenger GA (1885). Catalogue of the Lizards in the British Museum (Natural History). Second Edition. Volume II. Iguanidæ ... London: Trustees of the British Museum (Natural History). (Taylor and Francis, printers). xiii + 497 pp. + Plates I-XXIV. (Basiliscus galeritus, pp. 110–111).
Duméril AMC, Duméril AHA (1851). Catalogue méthodique de la collection des reptiles du Muséum d'Histoire Naturelle de Paris [Systematic Catalogue of the Collection of Reptiles of the Museum of Natural History of Paris]. Paris: Gide et Baudry / Roret. 224 pp. (Basiliscus galeritus, new species, p. 61). (in French).

Basiliscus
Reptiles of Colombia
Reptiles of Ecuador
Reptiles described in 1851
Taxa named by André Marie Constant Duméril
Taxa named by Auguste Duméril